Isabella Seymour-Conway may refer to:
 Isabella Ingram-Seymour-Conway, Marchioness of Hertford (1759–1834)
 Isabella Seymour-Conway, Countess of Hertford (1726–1782)